Launce can refer to:

 A character in Shakespeare's play The Two Gentlemen of Verona
 A type of fish, also known as a Sand lance